Chalfont is a borough with home rule status in Bucks County, Pennsylvania. The population was 4,009 at the 2010 census. The borough is served by SEPTA Regional Rail's Lansdale/Doylestown Line at Chalfont station.

Chalfont is named after Chalfont St Giles in Buckinghamshire, England. Chalfont was the home of William Penn's first wife, and William Penn is buried at Jordans Quaker Meeting House near Chalfont St Giles.

History
Originally, the Lenape Indians dwelled in present-day Chalfont. In 1683, William Penn signed a treaty with the local chief and parceled the land to the Free Society of Traders. In 1720, Simon Butler bought over 150 acres of land, including the "Village of Chalfont." After the construction of his home and mill, Butler bought more than 400 more acres of land. Butler was a giant historical figure who acted as a legal and economic powerhouse in the area. After his death, the land was parceled to a number of people. Between then and 1901 Chalfont held several names, including Butler's Mill, Kungle's Tavern, Barndtsville, and Whitehallville. For many years, the most important building in the area was the tavern and public house, which has burnt down many times and now stands as the Pop Inn. During the Victorian era, a train-station was built which helped the community grow and brought about the construction of the many Victorian houses.

In 1885, Chalfont established Forest Park. Forest park started out as a small picnic ground where music could be played. The appearance of the train station in Chalfont assured the park's success. However, as the park grew it became a small amusement park where local people could enjoy rides, a large swimming pool built in the 1930s, music (including string bands in the 1940s) and as the hosting ground for many company picnics. The park closed its doors forever in 1968.

George Eckhart later owned the Butler's mill which burned in 1835, he built a larger mill. Later Eckhart's son Martin inherited the mill and his other son inherited the farm. Part of the farmland included woods of mostly oak locally known as Eckhart's Grove which was frequently used for dance parties, family gatherings, religious camp meetings and Sunday School picnics. Later, in 1885 the mill was owned by Philip B. Grove who leased it to Valentine B. Clymer and Matthew S. Cogan when it burned again and was never rebuilt. Another gristmill was built in 1793 not far from Bulter's mill first operated by men named Miller and Evans, later by Francis D. Hartzel, two of his sons succeeded him. After a fire in 1878, the mill was rebuilt and much of the machinery replaced. About 1761, Henry Lewis built a stone tavern operated by George Kungle during the Revolutionary period. Chalfont was known as Kungles Tavern. After Kungle, the tavern was later owned consecutively by James Morris, Lewis Morris, Abner Morris, then John Barndt from Tylersport. The village was then known as Barndtsville.

William Stevens had a store on the south bank of the West Branch Neshaminy Creek and opened a post office in 1845. Chalfont was then known as Whitehallville. In 1869, the North Pennsylvania Railroad changed the name of the station to Chalfont. Sometime before 1885, the farm inherited by Charles Eckhart was purchased by Isaac Funk. On 27 June 1885, Funk opened the Forest Park on the grounds of the Eckhart's Grove. Guest speakers were attorneys from Doylestown J. Freeman Hendricks and John D. James. Music was provided by the Chalfont Cornet Band. On 20 June 1778, detachments of George Washington's army passed through the West Branch Neshaminy Creek and the North Branch Neshaminy Creek as they travelled from their camp at Valley Forge to Monmouth.

Geography
Neshaminy Creek and Pine Run pass through Chalfont.

Chalfont is located within the Delaware Valley.

Climate
According to the Köppen climate classification system, Chalfont has a Hot-summer Humid continental climate (Dfa). Dfa climates are characterized by at least one month having an average mean temperature ≤ , at least four months with an average mean temperature ≥ , at least one month with an average mean temperature ≥  and no significant precipitation difference between seasons. Although most summer days are slightly humid in Chalfont, episodes of heat and high humidity can occur with heat index values > . The average wettest month is July, which corresponds with the annual peak in thunderstorm activity. Episodes of extreme cold and wind can occur, with wind chill values < . Ice storms and large snowstorms depositing ≥  of snow occur once every few years, particularly during nor’easters from December through February.

Ecology
According to the A. W. Kuchler U.S. potential natural vegetation types, Chalfont would have a dominant vegetation type of Appalachian Oak (104) with a dominant vegetation form of Eastern Hardwood Forest (25). The spring bloom typically begins by April 11 and fall color usually peaks by October 30.

Transportation

U.S. Route 202 Business and Pennsylvania Route 152 are the numbered highways traversing Chalfont. US 202 Business follows the old alignment of US 202 along Butler Avenue. PA 152 follows a southeast-northwest alignment via Limekiln Pike, Butler Avenue and Main Street, running concurrently with US 202 Business for a short stretch.

Chalfont is served by the Chalfont station on SEPTA Regional Rail's Lansdale/Doylestown Line, which provides service to Doylestown and Center City Philadelphia. Bucks County Transport operates the DART West bus, which runs weekdays from Chalfont to a connection with the Doylestown DART bus to Doylestown at Delaware Valley University.

Demographics

As of the 2010 census, the borough was 92.7% Non-Hispanic White, 1.4% Black or African American, 0.3% Native American, 3.0% Asian, and 0.8% were two or more races. 1.7% of the population were of Hispanic or Latino ancestry.

As of the census of 2000, there were 3,977 people, 1,382 households, and 1,039 families residing in the borough. The racial makeup of the borough was 95.56% White, 1.15% African American, 0.08% Native American, 1.49% Asian, 0.05% from other races, and 0.77% from two or more races. Hispanic or Latino of any race were 1.25% of the population.

There were 1,382 households, out of which 40.1% had children under the age of 18 living with them, 66.2% were married couples living together, 6.9% had a female householder with no husband present, and 24.8% were non-families. 19.6% of all households were made up of individuals, and 4.8% had someone living alone who was 65 years of age or older. The average household size was 2.78 and the average family size was 3.25.

In the borough the population was spread out, with 29.1% under the age of 18, 5.5% from 18 to 24, 34.9% from 25 to 44, 21.9% from 45 to 64, and 8.6% who were 65 years of age or older. The median age was 36 years. For every 100 females, there were 96.9 males. For every 100 females age 18 and over, there were 94.4 males.

The median income for a household in the borough was $63,491, and the median income for a family was $70,592. Males had a median income of $51,139 versus $30,842 for females. The per capita income for the borough was $26,248. About 1.1% of families and 4.1% of the population were below the poverty line, including 1.4% of those under age 18 and 3.2% of those age 65 or over.

Arts and culture
The Chalfont Historic District is listed on the National Register of Historic Places and contains many  American colonial and Victorian-style houses. Several of these are former residences which are currently occupied by businesses and are concentrated near the intersection of Butler Avenue (U.S. Route 202 Business) and North Main Street (Pennsylvania Route 152) and extend along North Main Street.

Notable person

 Bobby Shantz, 1952 American League Most Valuable Player, operated a popular bowling alley and diner with baseball players Joe Astroth and Shantz's brother Billy. The Pit-Catcher displayed Bobby's Golden Gloves, MVP trophy, and other baseball memorabilia.

References

External links

 Chalfont Borough official website

Boroughs in Bucks County, Pennsylvania
Home Rule Municipalities in Pennsylvania
Populated places established in 1765
Populated places in Bucks County, Pennsylvania
1765 establishments in Pennsylvania